Dennis Rohde (born 24 June 1986) is a German lawyer and politician of the Social Democratic Party (SPD) who has been serving as a member of the Bundestag from the state of Lower Saxony since 2013 elections.

Political career 
Rohde first became member of the Bundestag in the 2013 German federal election, representing Oldenburg – Ammerland. He has since been a member of both the Budget Committee and the Audit Committee. From 2014 until 2016, he also served on the Committee on Legal Affairs and Consumer Protection.

On the Budget Committee, Rohde has been the SPD parliamentary group's rapporteur on the annual budgets of the Federal Ministry of Defence and the Federal Constitutional Court since 2018. Since 2020, he has been his parliamentary group's spokesperson on budgetary affairs. He also joined the so-called Confidential Committee (Vertrauensgremium) of the Budget Committee, which provides budgetary supervision for Germany's three intelligence services, BND, BfV and MAD. 

Also since 2020, Rohde has been a member of the parliament’s Council of Elders, which – among other duties – determines daily legislative agenda items and assigns committee chairpersons based on party representation.

Within his parliamentary group, Rohde belongs to the Seeheim Circle.

In the negotiations to form a so-called traffic light coalition of the SPD, the Green Party and the Free Democratic Party (FDP) following the 2021 federal elections, Rohde was part of his party's delegation in the working group on financial regulation and the national budget, co-chaired by Doris Ahnen, Lisa Paus and Christian Dürr.

Other activities 
 Sozialverband Deutschland (SoVD), Member
 German United Services Trade Union (ver.di), Member
 Workers' Welfare Federal Association (AWO), Member

References

External links 

  
 Bundestag biography 

1986 births
Living people
Members of the Bundestag for Lower Saxony
Members of the Bundestag 2021–2025
Members of the Bundestag 2017–2021
Members of the Bundestag 2013–2017
Members of the Bundestag for the Social Democratic Party of Germany